A peninsula ( from paene "almost" and insula "island") is a piece of land that is bordered mostly by water but connected to mainland. The surrounding water is usually understood to be continuous, though not necessarily named as such. A peninsula can also be a headland, cape, island promontory, bill, point,
or spit. A point is generally considered a tapering piece of land projecting into a body of water that is less prominent than a cape. In English, the plural of peninsula is peninsulas or, less commonly, peninsulae. A river which courses through a very tight meander is also sometimes said to form a "peninsula" within the (almost closed) loop of water.

Presented below is a list of peninsulas.

Africa

Macaronesia
 Jandía, Fuerteventura, Canary Islands, Spain
 Macizo de Anaga, Tenerife, Canary Islands, Spain
 Ponta de São Lourenço, Madeira Island, Portugal

North Africa

 Cabo Blanco, Mauritania/Morocco
 Cap Bon, Tunisia
 Cap Zebib, Tunisia
 Ceuta, Spain
 Río de Oro Peninsula, Western Sahara
 Ras Banas, Egypt
 Ras ben Sakka, Tunisia

Somali Peninsula

The Horn of Africa is a peninsula in Northeast Africa that juts into the Guardafui Channel, and is the easternmost projection of the African continent. It denotes the region containing the countries of Djibouti, Eritrea, Ethiopia, Somalia, and Somaliland.

 Buri Peninsula, Eritrea
 Ras Hafun, Somalia
 Ras Kasar, Eritrea
 Ras Siyyan, Djibouti

West Africa

 Lekki Peninsula, Lagos, Nigeria
 Cap-Vert, Senegal
 Turner's Peninsula, Sierra Leone

Other peninsulas in Africa

 Bakassi, Cameroon, but disputed with Nigeria
 Cape Peninsula, South Africa
 Le Morne Brabant, Mauritius
 Uyoma, Kenya

Antarctica
 Antarctic Peninsula
 Edward VII Peninsula
 Fletcher Peninsula
 Fowler Peninsula
 Martin Peninsula

Asia

Central Asia
Kazakhstan
 Mangyshlak Peninsula

Eastern Asia

China

 Liaodong Peninsula
 Shandong Peninsula
 Leizhou Peninsula

Hong Kong
 Kowloon Peninsula
 Sai Kung Peninsula
 Stanley Peninsula
 Shek O

Japan

Hokkaido
 Shiretoko Peninsula
 Shakotan Peninsula

Honshū
 Oshika-hanto
 Noto-hanto
 Oga-hanto
 Miura-hanto
 Bōsō-hanto

Kyūshū
 Nishi-sonogi-hanto
 Satsuma-hanto
 Ōsumi-hanto

Korea

The whole landmass encompassing North and South Korea is a peninsula, surrounded by the Sea of Japan to the east and south, and the Yellow Sea to the west and south, with the Korea Strait connecting them.

Macau
 Macau Peninsula

Taiwan
 Hengchun Peninsula

Northern Asia

 Chukchi Peninsula
 Faddeyevsky Peninsula
 Gyda Peninsula
 Kamchatka Peninsula
 Mikhailov Peninsula 
 Muravyov-Amursky Peninsula
 Taymyr Peninsula
 Yamal Peninsula
 Kola Peninsula, A peninsula near the border with Finland. Stretches into the White Sea

South-eastern Asia

Indochina
 Indochina Peninsula
 Malay Peninsula

Indonesia

 Blambangan Peninsula, Java,
 Semenanjung Minahassa, Sulawesi
 East Peninsula, Sulawesi
 South-east Peninsula, Sulawesi
 South Peninsula, Sulawesi
 Bird's Head Peninsula, West Papua Province
 Cape Mangkalihat, East Kalimantan

Malaysia
 Northwestern Peninsula, Kudat
 Pitas Peninsula, Pitas
 Semporna Peninsula, Semporna and Tawau
 Sandakan Peninsula, Sandakan
Peninsula Malaysia

Philippines

 Bataan Peninsula, Luzon
 Bicol Peninsula, Luzon
 Caramoan Peninsula, Bicol
 Bondoc Peninsula, Luzon
 Calatagan Peninsula, Luzon
 Calumpan Peninsula, Luzon
 Cavite City, Luzon
 San Ildefonso Peninsula, Luzon
 Redondo Peninsula, Luzon
 Zamboanga Peninsula, Mindanao
 Tinaca Point, Davao del Sur
 Guanguan Peninsula, Mindanao
 Northwest Panay Peninsula, Visayas
 Poro Point, La Union

Singapore
 Tuas

Vietnam

 Cà Mau Peninsula, Cà Mau Province
 Hòn Gốm Peninsula, Da Lat City
 Sơn Trà Peninsula, Da Nang
 Ngũ Xã Peninsula, Hanoi
 Bình Quới Peninsula, Ho Chi Minh City
 Cam Ranh Peninsula, Khánh Hòa Province
 Đầm Môn Peninsula
 Trà Cổ Peninsula, Quảng Ninh Province
 Phương Mai Peninsula, Quy Nhon

Southern Asia

The Deccan Peninsula is a dominant geographical feature of the Indian Subcontinent.

Other peninsulas on the Indian Subcontinent include:

 Bandra Peninsula, Mumbai
 Colaba Peninsula, Mumbai
 Gwadar Peninsula, Pakistan
 Jaffna Peninsula, Northern Sri Lanka
 Kanyakumari Peninsula, Tamil Nadu
 Kathiawar Peninsula, Gujarat
 Malabar Point Peninsula, Mumbai
 Manhoro, Karachi, Sindh, Pakistan
 Worli Peninsula, Mumbai

Western Asia

Arabia
 Arabian Peninsula; Saudi Arabia, Iraq, Kuwait, Bahrain, Qatar, Jordan, United Arab Emirates, Yemen, Oman
 Al-Faw Peninsula, Iraq
 Musandam Peninsula; Oman, United Arab Emirates

Eastern Mediterranean
 Beirut, Lebanon
 El Mina, Lebanon
 Haifa, Israel
 Acre, Israel
 Sinai Peninsula, Egypt

Turkey

 Anatolian Peninsula
 Armutlu Peninsula
 Biga Peninsula
 Datça Peninsula
 Dilek Peninsula
 Karaburun Peninsula
 Kapıdağ Peninsula
 Kocaeli Peninsula
 Sinop Peninsula
 Teke Peninsula
 Gallipoli

Europe
Europe is sometimes considered to be a large peninsula extending off Eurasia. As such, it is one of the largest peninsulas in the world and the only one to have the status as a full continent, largely as a matter of convention rather than science.  It is composed of many smaller peninsulas, the four main and largest component peninsulas being the Scandinavian, Iberian, Balkan, and Apennine peninsulas.

Balkan Peninsula 

The Balkans is a peninsula including Albania, Bosnia and Herzegovina, Bulgaria, Croatia, Greece, Kosovo, North Macedonia, Montenegro, Romania, Serbia, Slovenia and the European part of Turkey.

 * Sofia, Bulgaria

France
 Brittany
 Cap Corse, Corsica
 Cotentin Peninsula, Normandy
 Crozon, Finistère
 Landes du Médoc, Aquitaine

Iberian Peninsula

Encompassing continental Portugal and Spain, Andorra, Gibraltar (British Overseas Territory), and a small amount of Southern France, the Iberian Peninsula is a dominant geographical feature of Iberia.

Other peninsulas in Iberia include:

Ireland

Italy

The Apennine Peninsula is a dominant geographical feature of Italy.

Other peninsulas in Italy include:

Adriatic Sea
 Promontorio del Gargano

Ionian Sea
 Calabria
 Salento

Ligurian Sea
 Portofino
 Portovenere
 Promontorio di Piombino

Tyrrhenian Sea
 Gaeta
 Promontorio del Circeo 
 Promontorio dell'Argentario 
 Promontorio di Punta Ala 
 Sorrentine Peninsula

Malta
 Valletta
 Senglea
 Birgu
 Sliema
 Ta' Xbiex
 Marsaskala
 Fort Ricasoli

Russia

Scandinavia

Scandinavia is a region in Northern Europe, with strong historical, cultural, and linguistic ties. The term Scandinavia in local usage covers the three kingdoms of Denmark, located on the Jutland Peninsula, and Norway and Sweden, located on the Scandinavian Peninsula. In English usage, Scandinavia also sometimes refers to the Scandinavian Peninsula, or to the broader region including Finland and Iceland, which is always known locally as the Nordic countries.

The Scandinavian Peninsula, along with the islands, encompasses present-day Sweden, Norway, and the northwestern area of Finland.

Fennoscandia or the Fennoscandian Peninsula is the geographical peninsula comprising the Scandinavian Peninsula, Finland, Karelia, and the Kola Peninsula (Russia).

Norway

Sweden

Denmark

Finland
 Hanko Peninsula, Hanko
 Porkkala Peninsula, Kirkkonummi
 Suensaari, Tornio

Estonia

Turkey

Gallipoli Peninsula
Thracian Peninsula

Ukraine
Crimean Peninsula, occupied by Russia
Chonhar Peninsula
Kinburn Peninsula
Rybalskyi Peninsula

United Kingdom and the Crown Dependencies

England

Northern Ireland
 Ards Peninsula
 Islandmagee
 Lecale peninsula
 Ramore Head, Portrush
 Oxford Island
 Magilligan

Scotland

Wales
 Creuddyn Peninsula juts out of the North Wales coast
 Gower Peninsula, Swansea
 Llŷn Peninsula
 Marloes Peninsula, Pembrokeshire
 South Pembrokeshire Peninsula
 St Davids Head, Pembrokeshire
 Wales, itself a peninsula

Channel Islands
 Le Clos du Valle, Guernsey
 Little Sark, Sark

Isle of Man
 Langness Peninsula, Malew

Other peninsulas in Europe

North America

Belize

 Placencia Peninsula, Belize

Canada
 Dunlas Peninsula, Melville Island, Northwest Territories/Nunavut
 Labrador Peninsula, encompassing all of Labrador and most of Quebec
 Natkusiak Peninsula, Victoria Island, Northwest Territories/Nunavut
 Storkerson Peninsula, Victoria Island, Northwest Territories/Nunavut
 Wollaston Peninsula, Victoria Island, Northwest Territories/Nunavut

British Columbia

 Burrard Peninsula
 Saanich Peninsula, Vancouver Island
 Sechelt Peninsula 
 Tsawwassen Peninsula, which extends beyond the Canada/United States border, creating the pene-exclave of Point Roberts, Washington

New Brunswick

 Acadian Peninsula
 Kingston Peninsula

Newfoundland and Labrador

Newfoundland

 Avalon Peninsula 
 Baie Verte Peninsula
 Bonavista Peninsula
 Burin Peninsula
 Great Northern Peninsula
 Port au Port Peninsula

Northwest Territories

 Diamond Jennes Peninsula, Victoria Island
 Douglas Peninsula
 Leith Peninsula (in Great Bear Lake)
 Parry Peninsula
 Pethel Peninsula
 Prince Albert Peninsula, Victoria Island
 Sahoyúé-§ehdacho

Nova Scotia

 Aspotogan Peninsula
 Chebucto Peninsula
 Halifax Peninsula
 Nova Scotia peninsula
 Pubnico Peninsula

Nunavut

 Adelaide Peninsula
 Banks Peninsula
 Boothia Peninsula
 Bell Peninsula, Southampton Island
 Colin Archer Peninsula, Devon Island, Queen Elizabeth Islands
 Collinson Peninsula, Victoria Island
 Kent Peninsula
 Melville Peninsula
 Pangertot Peninsula
 Simpson Peninsula

Baffin Island

 Barrow Peninsula
 Becher Peninsula
 Beekman Peninsula
 Bell Peninsula
 Blunt Peninsula
 Borden Peninsula
 Brodeur Peninsula
 Cumberland Peninsula
 Foxe Peninsula
 Hall Peninsula
 Henry Kater Peninsula
 Meta Incognita Peninsula
 Siorarsuk Peninsula
 Steensby Peninsula

Ontario

 Cynthia Peninsula (in Lake Temagami)
 Joan Peninsula (in Lake Temagami)
 McLean Peninsula (in Lake Temagami)
 North Peninsula (in Lake Nipigon)
 Ontario Peninsula
 Bruce Peninsula, extending into Lake Huron
 100-Mile Peninsula (Essex County)
 Long Point (in Lake Erie)
 Niagara Peninsula
 Point Pelee (in Lake Erie)
 Prince Edward Peninsula (in Lake Ontario)
 Sibley Peninsula (in Lake Superior)

Quebec

 Gaspé Peninsula
 Ungava Peninsula

Caribbean

Dominican Republic
Peninsula de Samaná, Dominican Republic

Jamaica
   *[[Portland.      (Tichfeild high school)
  |Fort George peninsula]],Jamaica

Puerto Rico
 Barrio Obrero, Puerto Rico

Cuba
 Zapata Peninsula, Cuba
 Guanahacabibes Peninsula, Cuba
 Hicacos Peninsula, Cuba

Saint Lucia
 Vigie Peninsula, St Lucia

Costa Rica

 Nicoya Peninsula, Costa Rica
 Osa Peninsula, Costa Rica

Greenland
 Alfred Wegeners Halvo
 Hayes Halvo
 Ingnerit
 Nuussuaq Peninsula
 Sigguup Nunaa (Svartenhuk Halvø)

Mexico

 Baja California Peninsula, Mexico, containing the states of Baja California and Baja California Sur
 Yucatán Peninsula, partly separating the Gulf of Mexico from the Caribbean

Panama

 Península de Azuero, Panama

United States

Alaska
 Alaska Peninsula
 Cleveland Peninsula
 Kenai Peninsula
 Seward Peninsula
 Lisburne Peninsula

California

 Balboa Peninsula – in Newport Beach, Orange County.
 Monterey Peninsula – between Monterey Bay, the Salinas Valley, and the Santa Lucia Range in Monterey County.
 Palos Verdes Peninsula – along the Pacific between Santa Monica Bay and San Pedro Bay, in the South Bay Region of Los Angeles County.
 Point Loma Peninsula – between San Diego Bay and the Pacific Ocean in San Diego.
 Point Reyes Peninsula – west-northwest of San Francisco.
 San Francisco Peninsula – between the central−south San Francisco Bay and the Pacific in the San Francisco Bay Area. The Santa Cruz Mountains are a 'spine' along the middle & lower sections.
 Samoa Peninsula – the northern landform between Humboldt Bay and the Pacific
 Tiburon Peninsula –   between Richardson Bay and San Pablo Bay in east Marin County of the northern San Francisco Bay Area.

Florida

Florida is a well-known example of a large peninsula, with its land area divided between the larger Florida peninsula and the smaller Florida Panhandle on the north and west. It has several smaller peninsulas within it:

 Fairpoint Peninsula
 Pinellas peninsula, including St. Petersburg and Clearwater
 Much of Tampa lies on a peninsula called Interbay Peninsula jutting out into Tampa Bay
 Cape Sable

Maryland

 Maryland shares the Delmarva Peninsula east of Chesapeake Bay with Delaware and Virginia.
 St. Mary's Peninsula is defined by the Patuxent River, the Potomac River, and Chesapeake Bay.
 Calvert Peninsula lies between Chesapeake Bay and the Patuxent River.
 Numerous smaller tidal tributaries form smaller peninsulas on both the Eastern and Western shores of Chesapeake Bay. Named examples include the Broadneck Peninsula in Anne Arundel County and the Elk Neck Peninsula in Cecil County.

Massachusetts

 Cape Cod, Massachusetts, a cape that can be viewed as a peninsula
Cape Ann, includes the towns of Gloucester and Rockport
 Nahant, a town in Essex County, is on a small peninsula.
 Nantasket Peninsula, Hull
 Shawmut Peninsula, Boston

Michigan

Michigan – the only bi-peninsular state – is very distinguishable for its mitten-shaped Lower Peninsula which includes:
 Leelanau Peninsula
 Lost Peninsula
 Old Mission Peninsula
 Pointe Mouillee
 Presque Isle Peninsula
 Tawas Point
 The Thumb
 Waugoshance Point
 Woodtick Peninsula

The rabbit-shaped Upper Peninsula of Michigan contains: 
 Abbaye Peninsula
 Garden Peninsula
 Keweenaw Peninsula
 Rabbit's Back
 Stonington Peninsula

New Jersey

Barnegat Peninsula
 Cape May Peninsula
 Sandy Hook
 New Barbadoes Neck lies between the Hackensack River and Passaic River
 Caven Point in Jersey City is a part of Liberty State Park and Port Liberte.
 Bergen Point and Constable Hook are two peninsulas in Bayonne, which itself lies on peninsula surrounded by Upper New York Bay, Newark Bay, and the Kill van Kull, formerly known as Bergen Neck
 Droyer's Point and Kearny Point mark the mouth of the Hackensack River
 MOTBY and Port Jersey are man-made peninsulas extending in Upper New York Bay

New York

 The Bronx, New York, and Yonkers, New York
 Long Island was once a peninsula connected to North America during the great Ice Ages, and includes two large peninsulas at its east end: the South Fork and the North Fork.
 Cumberland Head
 Coney Island was an island until it was expanded through land reclamation into the Coney Island Creek, thus becoming a peninsula.
 Rockaway Peninsula in southeastern Queens

 Irondequoit, NY (geographical headland)

Utah
 Antelope Island, Utah, becomes a peninsula when waters are low, on the south shore of the Great Salt Lake
 Promontory Peninsula, on the north eastern shore of the Great Salt Lake
 Stansbury Peninsula becomes an island when waters are high, on the south shore of the Great Salt Lake

Vermont
 Alburgh, Vermont, is on the Alburgh Tongue, a peninsula extending from Quebec, Canada into Lake Champlain

Virginia
 Middle Peninsula, on the western shore of the Chesapeake Bay
 Northern Neck, on the western shore of the Chesapeake Bay
 Virginia Peninsula, on the western shore of the Chesapeake Bay

Washington
 Key Peninsula in Puget Sound
 Kitsap Peninsula in Puget Sound
 Long Beach Peninsula
 Olympic Peninsula
 Magnolia, Seattle
 Tsawwassen Peninsula, which extends beyond the Canada/United States border, creating the pene-exclave of Point Roberts, Washington

Wisconsin
 Bark Point, Wisconsin in Lake Superior
 Bayfield Peninsula, Wisconsin in Lake Superior
 Chequamegon Point, Wisconsin in Lake Superior
 Door Peninsula, Wisconsin, in Lake Michigan
 Jones Island, Milwaukee, Wisconsin in Lake Michigan
 Little Tail Point, Wisconsin in Green Bay (Lake Michigan)
 Marshall's Point, Wisconsin on North Bay in Lake Michigan
 Mawikwe Point, Wisconsin on Mawikwe Bay in Lake Superior
 Roman Point on Siskiwit Bay, Wisconsin, in Lake Superior
 Toft Point between Bailey's Harbor, Wisconsin and Moonlight Bay, Wisconsin in Lake Michigan

Other states

 Delmarva Peninsula, encompassing parts of Maryland and Virginia, and most of Delaware
 Land Between the Lakes, Tennessee and Kentucky (the largest inland peninsula in the United States)
 Mokapu, Hawaii
 Presque Isle, Erie, Pennsylvania
 Port Bolivar, Texas
 Encinal Peninsula, Flour Bluff, Corpus Christi, Texas
 Kentucky Bend, Kentucky

Oceania

Australia 

 Beecroft Peninsula, New South Wales
 Bellarine Peninsula, Victoria
 Cape York Peninsula, Queensland
 Cobourg Peninsula, Northern Territory
 Kurnell Peninsula, New South Wales
 Dampier Peninsula, Western Australia
 Dudley Peninsula, South Australia
 Eyre Peninsula, South Australia
 Fleurieu Peninsula, South Australia
 Freycinet Peninsula, Tasmania
 Inskip Peninsula, Queensland
 Jervis Bay, Australian Capital Territory
 Mornington Peninsula, Victoria
 Redcliffe, Queensland
 Sir Richard Peninsula, South Australia
 Stockton, New South Wales
 Tasman Peninsula, Tasmania
 Wilsons Promontory, Victoria
 Woy Woy, New South Wales
 Yorke Peninsula, South Australia
 Younghusband Peninsula, South Australia

New Zealand

North Island 

 Aupouri Peninsula
 Bream Head
 Cape Brett
 Cape Kidnappers
 Cape Turnagain
 Coromandel Peninsula
 Karikari Peninsula
 Mahia Peninsula
 Miramar Peninsula
 Mount Maunganui
 Northland Peninsula
 Paritata Peninsula, Raglan
 Purerua Peninsula
 Tiritirimatangi Peninsula, Kawhia Harbour
 Whangaparaoa Peninsula

South Island 

 Banks Peninsula
 Bluff Peninsula
 Brunner Peninsula, Saint Arnaud
 Cape Campbell
 Cape Foulwind
 D'Urville-Peninsula, D'Urville Island
 Farewell Spit
 Kaikoura Peninsula
 McBrides Peninsula, Lake Monowai
 Otago Peninsula
 Tautuku Peninsula
 The Peninsula and Roys Peninsula, Lake Wanaka 
 Tiwai Point

Papua New Guinea
 Gazelle Peninsula, New Britain
 Huon Peninsula
 Papuan Peninsula

South America

Southern Cone 

The Southern Cone, like Europe, is sometimes considered to be a large peninsula. Geographically, the peninsula encompasses most of Chile, Argentina, Uruguay and Southern Brazil and the southernmost portion of Paraguay, which makes it one of the largest peninsulas in the world. Like the Indian Peninsula, the Southern Cone is sometimes considered to be a subcontinent.

Other peninsulas in South America

 Araya Peninsula, Venezuela
 Paraguaná Peninsula, Venezuela
 Paria Peninsula, Venezuela
 Guajira Peninsula, Venezuela/Colombia
 Illescas Peninsula, Peru
 Paracas Peninsula, Peru
 Verde Peninsula, Argentina
 Valdes Peninsula, Argentina
 Punta del Este, Uruguay
 Taitao Peninsula, Chile
 Brunswick Peninsula, Chile
 Itapagipe Peninsula, Brazil
 Cabo de São Tomé, Brazil

See also
Cape (geography)
Headland
Isthmus
Promontory
Salient (geography)
Spit (landform)
Tombolo

References

External links

 

Coastal geography
Coastal and oceanic landforms
Oceanographical terminology